This article contains a list of rock carvings in Norway.

Locations

Rock carvings in the different counties of Norway:

 Akershus:
 Rock carvings at Kolsås (shipping), Bærum municipality
 Rock carvings at Bingfoss (hunting)
 Rock carvings at Skjellerud gård (shipping), Frogn municipality
 Rock carvings at Søndre Ski gård (farming), Ski municipality
 Rock carvings at Nordre Ski gård (farming), Ski municipality
 Buskerud:
 Rock carvings at Skogerveien (hunting), Drammen municipality
 Rock carvings at Åskollen (hunting), Drammen municipality
 Rock carvings at Hvittingfoss (shipping, farming), Kongsberg municipality
 Rock carvings at Katsundholmen (hunting), Modum municipality
 Rock carvings at Kistefoss (hunting), Modum municipality
 Rock carvings in Central Norway (Trøndelag, parts of Nordland, and parts of Møre og Romsdal):
Rock carvings at Bøla
Rock carvings at Bardal
Rock carvings at Evenhus
Rock carvings at Hell
Rock carvings at Leirfall
Rock carvings at Stykket
 Finnmark:

 Rock carvings at Alta
 Rock carvings at Sandbukt in Sørøysundet on Sørøya in Hammerfest
 Rock carvings at Gåshopen in Sørøy in Hammerfest
 Helleristningsparken in Kvalsund with rocks removed from Leirbukt, Stokkeberg, and Fægfjord (all in Reppafjord in Hammerfest)
 Rock carvings at Aldon Nesseby
Hedmark:
 Rock carvings at Stein (hunting), Ringsaker municipality
 Hordaland:
 Møre og Romsdal:

 Rock carvings at Boggestranda, Nesset municipality
 Rock carvings at Nord-Heggdal (fishing, hunting), Midsund municipality
 Rock carvings at Søbstad, Averøy municipality
 Rock carvings at Reitaneset (hunting), Aukra
 Rock carvings at Hinna (hunting), Tingvoll
 Rock carvings at Honhammerneset (fishing), Tingvoll
 Rock carvings in Central Norway
 Nordland:
 Rock carvings at Vistnesdalen (hunting), Vevelstad municipality
 Rock carvings at Rødøy (hunting), Rødøy municipality
 Rock carvings at Klubba (hunting), Meløy municipality
 Rock carvings at Fykanvatn (hunting), Meløy municipality
 Rock carvings at Vågan (hunting), Bodø municipality
 Rock carvings at Sagelva (hunting), Hamarøy municipality
 Rock carvings at Leiknes (hunting), Tysfjord municipality
 Rock carvings at Valle (hunting), Lødingen municipality
 Rock carvings at Forså (fishing), Lødingen municipality
 Rock carvings at Sandvågmoen (cups), Steigen municipality
 Rock carvings at Forselv (hunting, fishing), Narvik municipality
 Rock carvings at Brennholtet (hunting), Narvik municipality
 Rock carvings at Herjangen (hunting), Narvik municipality
 Rock carvings at Kanstadfjorden (hunting, fishing), Lødingen municipality
 Rock carvings at Dønna (fallos), Dønna municipality
 Rock carvings in Central Norway
 Oppland:

 Rock carvings at Drotten (hunting), Lillehammer municipality
 Rock carvings at Glemmestad (hunting), Østre Toten municipality
 Rock carvings at Eidefoss (hunting), Nord-Fron municipality
 Rock carvings at Møllerstufossen (hunting), Nordre Land municipality
 Rock carvings at Vang church (cups), Vang municipality
 Oslo:
 Rock carvings at Brannfjell (farming), Oslo
 Rock carvings at Blindern (farming), Oslo
 Rock carvings at Ekebergsletta (farming), Oslo
 Rock carvings at Fossumberget (farming), Oslo
 Rock carvings at Gaustad (farming), Oslo
 Rock carvings at Sjømannsskolen Ekeberg (hunting), Oslo
 Rock carvings at Skillebekk (shipping), Oslo
 Rogaland:
 Rock carvings at Fluberget (shipping), Stavanger
 Rock carvings at Solbakk (shipping), Tau
 Rock carvings at Austre Åmøy (shipping), Stavanger
 Sogn og Fjordane:
 Rock carvings at Ausevik (hunting), Flora
 Rock carvings at Vingen (hunting), Bremanger
 Telemark:
 Troms:

 Rock carvings at Tennes (hunting) in Balsfjord
 Rock carvings at Skavberg in Tromsø
 Rock carvings at Vik in Rolla in Ibestad
 Rock carvings at Kjeøy in Harstad
 Rock carvings at Åsli in Malangen in Balsfjord
 (Tromsø University Museum has some rocks removed from other sites in Troms and Finnmark)
 Trøndelag:
 Rock carvings in Central Norway
 Vest-Agder:
 Rock carvings at Jærberget, Farsund
 Rock carvings at Grobstranda (hunting), Farsund
 Rock carvings at Forbergodden (hunting), Farsund
 Rock carvings at Gerdberget (farming), Farsund
 Rock carvings at Lista (various), Farsund
 Vestfold:
 Rock carvings at Haugen gård (farming), Sandefjord municipality
 Rock carvings at Virik school (farming)
 Østfold:
 Rock carvings at Hjelmungen (farming), Halden municipality
 Rock carvings at Alkerød(farming), Halden municipality
 Rock carvings at Bakkehaugen (shipping), Ingedal
 Rock carvings at Solberg (shipping), Sarpsborg municipality
 Rock carvings at Bossum farm (farming), Sarpsborg municipality
 Rock carvings at Busgård farm (farming), Sarpsborg municipality
 Rock carvings at Post-Hornes (farming), Sarpsborg municipality
 Rock carvings at Bø (farming), Sarpsborg municipality
 Rock carvings at Flatbeggårdene (farming), Sarpsborg
 Rock carvings at Bjørnstad (shipping), Sarpsborg
 Rock carvings at Østre Vik (farming), Skjeberg
 Rock carvings at Borgen (farming), Sarpsborg
 Rock carvings at Hafslund (farming), Sarpsborg
 Rock carvings at Begby (farming, shipping), Fredrikstad
 Rock carvings at Lilleborge (farming), Fredrikstad
 Rock carvings at Årum (farming), Sarpsborg
 Rock carvings at Skjelin (farming), Fredrikstad
 Rock carvings at Glomma (farming), Sarpsborg
 Rock carvings at Kalnes Landbruksskole (farming, shipping), Sarpsborg
 Rock carvings at Alvim (farming), Sarpsborg
 Rock carvings at Hauge (farming), Fredrikstad
 Rock carvings at Rå (farming), Fredrikstad
 Rock carvings at Evje (farming), Fredrikstad

See also
Pre-historic art
Petroglyph
History of Norway
List of World Heritage Sites in Europe

External links
 Rock art at Directorate for Cultural Heritage — in Norwegian (there are also English pages)